Ashar (also Romanized as Āshār; also known as Ashor and Ashur) is a village in Ashar Rural District, Ashar District, Mehrestan County, Sistan and Baluchestan Province, Iran. At the 2006 census, its population was 2,676, in 529 families.

References 

Populated places in Mehrestan County